Martin Charles Golumbic (born 1948) is a mathematician and computer scientist known for his research on perfect graphs, graph sandwich problems, compiler optimization, and spatial-temporal reasoning. He is a professor emeritus of computer science at the University of Haifa, and was the founder of the journal Annals of Mathematics and Artificial Intelligence.

Education and career
Golumbic majored in mathematics at Pennsylvania State University, graduating in 1970 with bachelor's and master's degrees. He completed his Ph.D. at Columbia University in 1975, with the dissertation Comparability Graphs and a New Matroid supervised by Samuel Eilenberg.

He became an assistant professor in the Courant Institute of Mathematical Sciences of New York University from 1975 until 1980, when he moved to Bell Laboratories. From 1983 to 1992 he worked for IBM Research in Israel, and from 1992 to 2000 he was a professor of mathematics and computer science at Bar-Ilan University. He moved to the University of Haifa in 2000, where he founded the Caesarea Edmond Benjamin de Rothschild Institute for Interdisciplinary Applications of Computer Science.

In 1989, Golumbic founded the Bar-Ilan Symposium in Foundations of Artificial Intelligence, a leading artificial intelligence conference in Israel. In 1990 Golumbic became the founding editor-in-chief of the journal Annals of Mathematics and Artificial Intelligence, published by Springer.

Recognition
Golumbic is a fellow of the European Association for Artificial Intelligence (2005). He was elected to the Academia Europaea in 2013.

At the 2019 Bar-Ilan Symposium in Foundations of Artificial Intelligence, Golumbic was given the Lifetime Achievement and Service Award of the Israeli Association for Artificial Intelligence.

Selected publications
Golumbic is the author of books including:
Algorithmic Graph Theory and Perfect Graphs (Academic Press, 1980; 2nd ed., Elsevier, 2004)
Tolerance Graphs (with Ann Trenk, Cambridge University Press, 2004)
Fighting Terror Online: The Convergence of Security, Technology, and the Law (Springer, 2008)

Other highly-cited publications of Golumbic include:

References

External links
Home page

1948 births
Living people
20th-century American mathematicians
21st-century  Israeli mathematicians
Graph theorists
Pennsylvania State University alumni
Columbia University alumni
Courant Institute of Mathematical Sciences faculty
IBM employees
Academic staff of Bar-Ilan University
Academic staff of the University of Haifa
Members of Academia Europaea
Artificial intelligence researchers